Raj Bhavan, Uttarakhand may refer to:

 Raj Bhavan, Dehradun, official residence of the governor of Uttarakhand, located in Dehradun.
 Raj Bhavan, Nainital, official residence of the governor of Uttarakhand, located in Nainital.